The  was a division of the eighth century Japanese government of the Imperial Court in Kyoto, instituted in the Asuka period and formalized during the Heian period.  The Ministry was replaced in the Meiji period.

Overview
The nature of the ministry was modified in response to changing times.  The ambit of the Gyōbu-shō activities encompassed, for example:
 administration and conduct of trials 
 oversight of the determination of the severity of punishments 
 regulation of the imposition of fines, imprisonments, and penal servitude

History
The duties, responsibilities and focus of the ministry evolved over time. The ritsuryō system of laws were interpreted and applied by bureaucracies which distinguished punishment (gyōbushō) and censorship (danjodai).

Hierarchy
The Ministry of Justice brought together a judiciary and penal system management.

The top ritsuryō officials within this ministry structure were:
 
 
 
 
 , two positions
 .  There are three classes of officials under the control of the chief judge

See also
 Daijō-kan

Notes

References
 Kawakami, Karl Kiyoshi. (1903). The Political Ideas of the Modern Japan.  Iowa City, Iowa: University of Iowa Press. OCLC 466275784.   Internet Archive, full text
 Nussbaum, Louis Frédéric and Käthe Roth. (2005). Japan Encyclopedia. Cambridge: Harvard University Press. ; OCLC 48943301
 Titsingh, Isaac. (1834). Nihon Odai Ichiran; ou,  Annales des empereurs du Japon.  Paris: Royal Asiatic Society, Oriental Translation Fund of Great Britain and Ireland.  OCLC 5850691

Government of feudal Japan
Meiji Restoration
Justice
Japan